Nzeribe is a surname. Notable people with the surname include:

Arthur Nzeribe (1938–2022), Nigerian politician
Gogo Chu Nzeribe (died 1967), Nigerian trade unionist
Sambasa Nzeribe, Nigerian actor, model, and entertainer

Surnames of African origin